Ärsenik is a rap group based in Villiers-le-Bel, France, founded in 1992, and made up of two brothers, Lino (Gaëlino M'Bani) and Calbo (Calboni M'Bani), whose family is originally from Congo.

Career
Ärsenik started as a band in mid 1990s. Until 1997, the group also included Tony Truand, a cousin. In 1998, now a duo, Ärsenik released their first album Quelques gouttes suffisent went double gold.  A new album was planned for 2005, but the two brothers instead decided to concentrate on solo albums.  Lino released Paradis Assassiné en 2005, which was the name of a solo song on the group's second album.

In 2007 the group released a disc titled S'il en reste quelque chose which included the most popular songs from the two brothers, such as "L'enfer remonte à la surface", "Rime & chatiments" and "Sexe, pouvoir & biftons".

Revered as one of the original rap groups, their music voices the disaffection of the French underclass, combining African and Arabic melodies and beats with French lyrics. French rap is filled with slang that is hard for even French-speakers to understand; whole songs are delivered in Verlan, the ingenious, dizzying slang in which words are reversed or recombined. Like France's chanson tradition, French rap is also famous for emphasizing lyrics, and the rappers are widely viewed as heirs to the chansonniers.

As part of Bisso Na Bisso 
In the late 1990s, Lino and Calbo teamed up with a group of rappers who were also second-generation Africans, on a collaborative project called Bisso Na Bisso, an expression which means "just between ourselves" in Lingala, the most commonly spoken language in the Congo region. Part of this group were Ben-J (from Les Neg'Marrons), Passi (from Ministère A.M.E.R.),  twin brothers Doc and G Kill (from 2Bal), and Mystik and his female cousin M'Passi. The group embarked on a collective return to their African roots, featuring music with an innovative fusion of styles, that mixed modern hip-hop and zouk sounds with traditional Congolese rumba.

Members and solo/other projects

The members of Ärsenik have engaged in various personal projects besides the band. Rapper Lino has released two solo albums of his own, Paradis assassiné released in September 2005 and Radio Bitume released in May 2012. Both have charted in France and particularly Paradis assassiné released on Hostile Records was a great commercial success. The title is a title of an Ärsenik album. 
In 2004, he collaborated in a music project by Kery James in the single "Relève la tête" credited to "Kery James presents Lino, AP, Diam's, Passi, Matt & Kool Shen". In 2007, he also collaborated with three tracks on rapper Stomy Bugsy album Rimes Passionnelles and in 2009, took part in Bisso Na Bisso's project Africa. In 2012 he signed with AZ, now part of Universal Music.

Rapper Calbo continued with a solo music career. In 2003, he charted in a hit "Trop de peine" by Lynnsha featuring Calbo vocals. In 2012, he released his solo album titled 6ème Chaudron and in June 2013, he released his solo single "C'est là-bas" on Trèfle record label accompanied by a music video. It featured another fellow Congolese artist known as VR.

Discography

Studio albums

Compilation albums

Collaboration albums

Singles

See also
French rap
French hip hop
List of French hip hop artists
Secteur Ä
Stomy Bugsy
Lunatic
M.Dia

Footnotes

External links
Lino - Paradis assassiné official

French hip hop groups
Rappers from Val-d'Oise